Taxadienone ((+)-taxa-4(5),11(12)-dien-2-one) is an organic compound and a taxane. The compound is of some academic interest as a potential precursor to Taxol, in important anti-cancer drug, in a commercially viable process. A total synthesis of taxadienone was reported in 2012 together with its conversion to the next Taxol precursor taxadiene. A multigram synthetic method was reported in 2015.

References

Total synthesis
Taxanes
Tricyclic compounds